Pteria is a genus of molluscs in the family Pteriidae. The species of the genus are sometimes referred to as wing-oysters or winged oysters.

Selected species
The World Register of Marine Species includes the following species in the genus:

 Pteria admirabilis Wang, 2002
 Pteria aegyptiaca (Dillwyn, 1817)
 Pteria atlantica (Lamarck, 1819)
 Pteria avicular  (Holten, 1802)
 Pteria bernhardi  (Iredale, 1939)
 Pteria broomei  Huber, 2010
 Pteria brunnea  (Pease, 1863)
 Pteria bulliformis  Wang, 2002
 Pteria colymbus (Roding, 1798) — Atlantic wing-oyster
 Pteria cooki  Lamprell & Healy, 1997
 Pteria dendronephthya  Habe, 1960
 Pteria fibrosa  (Reeve, 1857)
 Pteria formosa  (Reeve, 1857)
 Pteria gregata  (Reeve, 1857)
 Pteria heteroptera  (Lamarck, 1819)
 Pteria hirundo Linnaeus, 1758
 Pteria howensis  Lamprell & Healy, 1997
 Pteria lata  (Gray in Eyre, 1845)
 Pteria levitata (Iredale, 1939)
 Pteria maccullochi (Iredale, 1939)
 Pteria maura  (Reeve, 1857)
 Pteria peasei  (Dunker, 1872) ‒ swift wing oyster
 Pteria penguin  (Röding, 1798) — Penguin's wing oyster
 Pteria saltata  (Iredale, 1931)
 Pteria spectrum  (Reeve, 1857)
 Pteria sterna Gould, 1851 — Pacific wing-oyster
 Pteria straminea  (Dunker, 1852)
 Pteria tortirostris  (Dunker, 1849)
 Pteria venezuelensis  (Dunker, 1872)

References

Pteriidae
Extant Triassic first appearances
Paleozoic life of Alberta
Bivalve genera